Ray's Boathouse is a restaurant in the Ballard neighborhood of Seattle, Washington, United States, located on  Shilshole Bay along the Puget Sound shoreline. It is noted for its seafood and views of Puget Sound and the Olympic Mountains, and has been listed as one of the city's top restaurants alongside The Herbfarm.

History
In 1939, founder Ray Lichtenberger, moved his growing boat rental and bait house to the current location and opened a coffeehouse in 1945. By 1952, he’d built the neon sign that flashes “RAY’S” in bold, red letters on the dock.

In 1973, Russ Wohlers led a group of local entrepreneurs in transforming the place into a full-service fresh seafood restaurant. The restaurant originally opened in June 1973. In 1983, Ray's was one of four restaurants that began serving fresh Copper River salmon for the first time, and is credited with bringing awareness of local food to Seattle's fish consumers. That year the restaurant also introduced commercially harvested Olympia oysters to its menu, heralding a "comeback" for the species which had had a total harvest measured in hundreds of gallons a few years earlier.

In 2002, Ray's was awarded in the America's Classics category of the James Beard Foundation Awards. In 2004, its then-executive chef Charles Ramseyer was recognized as one of the nation's most innovative fish chefs by Wine Spectator. The establishment was refurbished in 2013.

In popular culture
It appeared in 1,000 Places to See in the USA and Canada Before You Die, and has featured on lists of tourist destinations by Moon Guides (Williams), Fodor's and Frommer's, among others.

At one time the restaurant employed Chris Cornell as a chef, prior to him co-founding the rock band Soundgarden. Cornell attended the retirement party at Ray's of longtime chef Wayne Ludvigsen in 1997.

Bibliography

References

External links
 

1973 establishments in Washington (state)
Ballard, Seattle
James Beard Foundation Award winners
Restaurants established in 1973
Seafood restaurants in Seattle